Luterbach-Attisholz railway station is a railway station in the municipality of Luterbach, in the Swiss canton of Solothurn. It is an intermediate stop on the standard gauge Jura Foot line and is served by local trains only.

Services 
 the following services stop at Luterbach-Attisholz:

References

External links 
 
 

Railway stations in the canton of Solothurn
Swiss Federal Railways stations